Pohorje is a settlement in the Municipality of Cirkulane in the Haloze area of eastern Slovenia. It lies in the hills south of Cirkulane, on the border with Croatia. The area traditionally belonged to the Styria region. It is now included in the Drava Statistical Region.

The local church is dedicated to Saint Elisabeth of Hungary and belongs to the Parish of Cirkulane. It was built in 1673.

References

External links
Pohorje on Geopedia

Populated places in the Municipality of Cirkulane